The Kugelpanzer ("ball tank") is a one-man armoured vehicle built by Nazi Germany during World War II. The history of the vehicle is practically unknown other than the fact that at least one example was exported to the Empire of Japan and used by the Kwantung Army. The machine remains something of a mystery due to the lack of records and the incompleteness of the sole surviving model.

Surviving example
Only one example of the Kugelpanzer still exists today. It was captured by the Red Army in Manchuria and is on display in the collection of German armoured vehicles at the Kubinka Tank Museum in Moscow where it is described simply as "exhibit no. 37". There is no record of it ever having been used in combat.
However, another report states that it was captured at the Kummersdorf proving grounds along with the infamous Maus super-heavy tank. The vehicle was modified after its capture, repainted and its drive removed. In 2000 the original paintwork was restored.

Theories about the vehicle
Only five points seem certain based on the single known example:

It is a German-made vehicle that was shipped to Japan.
It was used as a light reconnaissance vehicle.
It was captured by Soviet troops in 1945, presumably in Manchuria.
The outer armour is only five millimetres thick.
The vehicle was powered by a single-cylinder two-stroke motorcycle engine.

One can only deduce the functionality of the vehicle based on its exterior. It seems to be a one-man reconnaissance tank, equipped with an armoured outer wall and a viewing slot. The drive was probably located under or behind the driver. At the rear there is a steerable wheel to shift the center of gravity behind the axis of the two track wheels and to support rotary movements that are carried out with the track wheels.
In stationary operation, the tank could probably serve as an armoured refuge or makeshift bunker. Based on available images, it cannot be determined whether there was an opening below the viewing slot to allow for the use of firearms from inside the tank.

Some articles claim that this vehicle is a hoax and was likely assembled by Soviet engineers as a joke. There are no wartime photographs or any official documentation regarding this vehicle, hole for the exhaust pipe is missing, the crude welds resemble those found on Soviet vehicles, all of this is highly suspicious.

Similar vehicles
Although not immediately equivalent, a possible precursor to the Kugelpanzer was a one-man World War I tank known in France as a bouclier roulant ("rolling shield"). A 1936 article in Popular Science described a Texan inventor's design for a spherical armoured vehicle that was dubbed a "tumbleweed tank". It was considerably larger than the Kugelpanzer - offering space for three people and three machine guns along with necessary motors and other equipment.

See also
Wunderwaffe
Monowheel

References

Books
Robert Dale Arndt Jr.: Strange Vehicles of Pre-War Germany & the Third Reich (1928–1945). 2006, IRP Publication

External links
 

World War II tanks of Germany